Acrapex leucophlebia  is a species of moth of the family Noctuidae first described by George Hampson in 1894. It is found in the Nilgiri Mountains of India.

The wingspan is 26–32 mm.

Description
Head and thorax ocherous mixed with brown; abdomen ocherous white slightly irrorated (sprinkled) with brown. Forewing ocherous white irrorated with red brown, the veins defined by slight brown streaks except on inner area; a slight brown streak below basal half of cell; the discocellulars with some brown points before and beyond them; a diffused oblique whitish fascia from apex to discal fold with a brown shade below it from termen below apex, with short brown streaks on its inner edge above and below vein 5; a terminal series of minute black lunulae; cilia whitish at base, dark at tips. Hindwing ocherous white tinged with reddish brown except on costal area; cilia ocherous white; the underside ocherous white slightly tinged with red brown.

References

Xyleninae
Moths of Asia